Joseph F. Fanta (February 21, 1914–May 2, 1988) was an American politician.

Fanta  was born in Chicago, Illinois. He went to the public schools. Fanta studied engineering at Northwestern University and Siebel Institute. Fanta was involved with the Democratic Party. He served as bailiff and deputy clerk for the Chicago Municipal Court. Fanta served in the Illinois House of Representatives from 1957 to 1962 and 1965 and 1966. Fanta died at Martha Washington Hospital in Chicago, Illinois.

Notes

1914 births
1988 deaths
Politicians from Chicago
Northwestern University alumni
Democratic Party members of the Illinois House of Representatives
20th-century American politicians